The 4th constituency of the Hauts-de-Seine is a French legislative constituency in the Hauts-de-Seine département.

Description
 From May 15, 1991 to March 31, 1992 and from April 4, 1992 to March 29, 1993, Michel Sapin was appointed Deputy Minister for Justice, then, on April 4, 1992, Minister of Finance. He is replaced by his substitute, Michel Thauvin.

Deputies

Election results

2022

 
 
 
 
 
 
|-
| colspan="8" bgcolor="#E9E9E9"|
|-

2017

 
 
 
 
 
 
 
|-
| colspan="8" bgcolor="#E9E9E9"|
|-

2012

 
 
 
 
 
 
|-
| colspan="8" bgcolor="#E9E9E9"|
|-

2007

 
 
 
 
 
 
|-
| colspan="8" bgcolor="#E9E9E9"|
|-

2002

 
 
 
 
 
 
|-
| colspan="8" bgcolor="#E9E9E9"|
|-

1997

 
 
 
 
 
|-
| colspan="8" bgcolor="#E9E9E9"|
|-

References

Sources
 

 Official results of French elections from 1998: 

4